Reed Timmer (born March 17, 1980) is an American meteorologist and storm chaser. He is known for starring in the Discovery Channel reality television series Storm Chasers, as well as in the documentary film Tornado Glory and in the series Tornado Chasers. He also worked with Mike Theiss in the reality television series Storms Rising on Disney+.

Early life 
Timmer became interested in the weather at a young age, after experiencing a severe thunderstorm that reportedly dropped golfball-sized hail in his yard. Later on, Timmer participated in the Science Olympiad competition in middle school and high school. After graduating from Forest Hills Central High School in Grand Rapids, MI, in 1998, he began studying meteorology at the University of Oklahoma (OU). In October of that year, he filmed his first tornado.

Career

Media 
Timmer followed severe weather with his TornadoVideos.net team in their vehicle, the SRV Dominator. He was featured in an interview on a bonus feature for the Into the Storm Blu-ray. Timmer also appeared in a 2004 episode of Nova.

Timmer was a storm chaser for KFOR-TV's 4WARN Storm Team, with his SRV Dominator 2 as 4WARN Dominator 4. Timmer left AccuWeather in October 2019 to become a content creator for weather forecasts and storm chasing, mostly on Facebook, Twitter, and YouTube.

Vehicles 

Timmer created several chase vehicles, each called the Dominator.

Dominator 1 
The first Dominator was a modified 2007 Chevrolet Tahoe that was used during the 2008 storm-chasing season and debuted in the 2009 chase season.

Dominator 2 
In early 2011, Timmer and other members of TVN purchased a 2011 GMC Yukon XL, which would be the base vehicle for a second Dominator vehicle named Dominator 2.

Dominator 3 
A third Dominator vehicle debuted in late April 2013. This vehicle, named Dominator 3, began life as a Ford F-350 crew-cab pickup featuring a 16-gauge body strengthened with a polyethylene Kevlar composite, thick Lexan windows and gull-wing doors to repel hail. When storms approach, hydraulic systems lower the vehicle to the ground and drive spikes 8 inches into the ground to prevent wind from getting underneath.

Dominator Fore 
With a heavy presence on Twitter, Reed was often found chasing in his 2018 Subaru Forester, donning the name Dominator Fore. Dominator Fore featured an increasing number of hail stone dents in its factory sheet metal body, and undergoes several windshield replacements each year due to Reed's attraction to sitting under what he refers to as Gorilla Hail storms. In September 2022, Timmer posted on Twitter that he had abandoned Dominator Fore to the storm surge of Hurricane Ian while tracking the storm at Pine Island, Florida. The car was later found battered, and was no longer drivable, although attempts to fix it are ongoing.

Dominator 5 
In December 2022, Timmer purchased a 2016 Subaru Forester to replace Dominator Fore.

Tornado chasing 
While chasing storms in 2009 in Aurora, Nebraska, a tornado strengthened while passing over the Dominator and blew out the driver's window. Its exterior Lexan window failed to roll up. Timmer and Chris Chittick suffered lacerations to the face from the flying glass. The incident was documented as part of the Storm Chasers TV series.

The day before the Yazoo City tornado of April 24, 2010, Timmer and colleague Joel Taylor got into a heated argument as to whether or not to make the trip. An EF4 tornado went through the town the next morning, and the team helped rescue people from the rubble. Taylor ended up saying that he was glad he committed to the chase as he saved lives.

Tornado Chasers 
Timmer started Tornado Chasers on his website TVNWeather.com. The first two seasons debuted in 2012 and 2013.

Season 1 
Season 1 included 12 episodes. Few tornadoes struck that year. In one episode, their SUV's windows were shattered by large hail.

Season 2 
Season 2 had far more tornadoes and footage than season 1. The most notable tornado was the May 31, 2013 El Reno tornado, which killed Tim Samaras. The season showed Timmer enrolling in the KFOR 4WARN Storm Chasing team. Joel Taylor returned for episodes 1 and 2. Jim Cantore and Ginger Zee also appeared.

Personal life 
In December 2015, he married meteorologist Maria Molina at the Masaya Volcano National Park in Nicaragua. They divorced in 2018.

On October 4, 2013, Timmer suffered a seizure while storm chasing in Nebraska as part of the KFOR-TV weather team and was rushed to a hospital by his team. According to Reed, it was his second seizure. Timmer was not driving.

Timmer has a dog named Gizmo who often accompanies him on chases.

See also

 KFOR-TV

References

Further reading

External links
 TornadoVideos.Net  and TVNweather
 
 Facebook

Storm chasers
Living people
University of Oklahoma alumni
People from Grand Rapids, Michigan
American meteorologists
1980 births